Verticordia penicillaris is a flowering plant in the myrtle family, Myrtaceae and is endemic to the south-west of Western Australia. It is a small, widely spreading shrub, usually with several main branches. It is readily distinguished from other verticordias by its yellow flowers with white fringes and purple hairs on the end of their long styles.

Description

Flowering time is mainly from September to October.

Taxonomy and naming
Verticordia penicillaris was first formally described by Ferdinand von Mueller in 1859 from a specimen collected by Augustus Oldfield and the description was published in Fragmenta phytographiae Australiae. The specific epithet (penicillaris) is a Latin word meaning "of a little tail" or "of a painter's brush" referring to the brush-like tip of the styles.

In his review of the genus in 1991, Alex George placed this species in subgenus Verticordia, section Penicillaris along with V. dasystylis.

Distribution and habitat
This verticordia is found between the Kalbarri National Park, the Arrowsmith River and Mullewa where it usually grows in shallow, gritty soil in areas that are wet in winter in the Avon Wheatbelt and Geraldton Sandplains biogeographic regions.

Conservation
 Verticordia penicillaris is classified as "Priority Four" by the Western Australian Government Department of Parks and Wildlife, meaning that is rare or near threatened.

Use in horticulture
This verticordia is usually propagated from cuttings and grows well in gravelly or sandy soils. Once established it is both frost and drought tolerant and has grown in the summer rainfall areas of eastern Australia.

References

penicillaris
Rosids of Western Australia
Eudicots of Western Australia
Plants described in 1859
Taxa named by Ferdinand von Mueller